The Polish Antarctic Expedition to the A. B. Dobrowolski Polar Station was conducted by a team of doctors, geophysicists, and geomorphologists between 1978 and 1979. It was sponsored by the Polish Academy of Sciences. This was the third expedition organised by the Polish Academy of Sciences, and included establishing a geodetic network in the Bunger Oasis, setting up an astronomical reference point, magnetic observations, and photogrammetric surveys to make maps of the vicinity of the station.

Geodetic Network
A geodetic network was established in the Bunger Oasis by Dr. A. Pachuta and Dr. J. Cisak, using theodolites Wild T2 and distancemeters Zeiss EOK, and consisted of 26 points.

Features named by the expedition
 Dalmor Bank, named after the expedition ship Dalmor
 Gdynia Point, named after Gdynia, Poland
 Klekowski Crag, named after Professor Romuald Klekowski
 Moby Dick Icefall, named during the 1981 expedition after the famous white whale of Herman Melville's 1851 novel Moby-Dick

See also
A.B. Dobrowolski Polar Station

References

 
Poland and the Antarctic
Historic Sites and Monuments of Antarctica
1978 in Antarctica
1979 in Antarctica
Antarctic expeditions
1978 in Poland
1979 in Poland